Bamba Assouman (born 1 January 1990), is an Ivorian footballer who plays as a defensive midfielder for Liga I club FC Vaslui.

Honours

Volyn Lutsk
Ukrainian First League: Runner-up 2009–10

References

External links
 profile at soccerway.com

1990 births
Living people
Ivorian footballers
Ivorian expatriate footballers
Expatriate footballers in Tunisia
Expatriate footballers in Saudi Arabia
Expatriate footballers in Romania
Expatriate footballers in Ukraine
Expatriate footballers in Egypt
Olympique Béja players
US Monastir (football) players
Najran SC players
Al-Taawoun FC players
FC Volyn Lutsk players
FC Vaslui players
Liga I players
Saudi Professional League players
Association football defenders